Eric D. Steinberg (born  August 26, 1969) is an American actor. He starred in the Freeform series Pretty Little Liars.

Early life
Steinberg was born in Washington, D.C. to a Korean mother and a mixed European father. He attended the University of Vermont and the University of Kent in England prior to receiving an acting fellowship at the University of California at Irvine.

Career
Steinberg had a minor role for Rage of Vengeance. His television credits include JAG, NCIS, CSI: Crime Scene Investigation, Star Trek: Voyager, CSI: Miami, Without a Trace, Zeke and Luther and Martin. From 2006 to 2007, he played Ji Min Kim in The Young and the Restless and Netan in Stargate: SG-1. He voiced Lord Shimura in Ghost of Tsushima.

Filmography

Film

Television

 Martin (1997, TV series) - Mr. Ho
 Yellow (1998) - Peter
 V.I.P. (1998, TV series) - Prince Jordan
 Largo (2000) - Nick Ramirez
 True Vinyl (2004) - Morita
 CSI: Miami (2005, TV series) - Daniel Vance
 Charmed (2005) - The Dogan
 NCIS (2005, TV series) - Marcos Siazon
 24 (2006, TV series) - Agent Davis
 Nip/Tuck (2006, TV series) - Dr. Mugavi
 Numbers (2006, TV series) - ATF Agent Rho
 The Unit (2007, TV series) - General Raja
 Without a Trace (2007, TV series) - Ray Greene
 Finding Madison (2008) - Holden Stay
 Second Chance (2016, TV series) - Cory

Video games

References

External links 
 

1969 births
American male film actors
American male soap opera actors
American male television actors
American male voice actors
20th-century American male actors
21st-century American male actors
American people of Korean descent
American male actors of Korean descent
Living people
Male actors from Washington, D.C.
University of Vermont alumni